Streamline may refer to:

Business 

 Streamline Air, American regional airline
 Adobe Streamline, a discontinued line tracing program made by Adobe Systems
 Streamline Cars, the company responsible for making the Burney car

Engineering 

 Streamlines, streaklines, and pathlines, in fluid flows
 Streamliner, any vehicle shaped to be less resistant to air

Film 
 Streamline (film), an upcoming Australian film directed by Tyson Wade Johnston

Media 

 Streamline Pictures, an American distribution company best known for distributing English dubbed Japanese animation
 Streamline Studios, an independent Dutch outsourcing and game developing studio
 Hal Roach's Streamliners, a series of short films made in the 1940s
 Streamline (comics), a fictional super-hero character
 Stream Line, the English title of the 1976 Italian film La linea del fiume starring Philippe Leroy (actor)
 Streamline, a newsletter published by the Migrant Clinicians Network

Music 

 Streamline Ewing (1917–2002), American jazz trombonist
 Streamline (Lenny White album), 1978
 Streamline (Lee Greenwood album), 1985
 "Streamline" (song), a 1994 song by Newton
 "Streamline", a song by System of a Down from the 2002 album Steal This Album!
 "Streamline", a song by Pendulum from the 2005 album Hold Your Colour
 "Streamline", a song by From Autumn to Ashes from the 2005 album Abandon Your Friends
 "Streamline", a song by VNV Nation from the 2011 album Automatic

Other 
 Orel VH2 Streamline, a French aircraft design
 Streamline (swimming), the position a swimmer takes underwater after pushing off a pool wall
 Streamline Moderne, an architectural style related to Art Deco
Operation Streamline, a program in the United States to prosecute illegal immigrants
Streamline, a brand of the United States Playing Card Company

See also
 Drag (physics)
 Process optimization
 Optimization (computer science)
 Rightsizing
 Streamlining the cities